Highley is a civil parish in Shropshire, England.  It contains 13 listed buildings that are recorded in the National Heritage List for England.  Of these, one is at Grade II*, the middle of the three grades, and the others are at Grade II, the lowest grade.  The parish contains the village of Highley and the surrounding countryside.  Most of the listed buildings are houses and farmhouses, many of which are timber framed.  The other listed buildings are a church, the remains of a cross in the churchyard, two bridges, and a war memorial.

Key

Buildings

References

Citations

Sources

Lists of buildings and structures in Shropshire